BC Vision is a minor political party in the province of British Columbia, Canada. Its motto is "One Vision One World."

It nominated four candidates in the 2013 British Columbia election, all within the city of Surrey, British Columbia.

BC Vision's platform includes technology development, environmental conservation, public health, cross-generational communication, senior education, and fiscal responsibility.

BC Vision nominated Jagmohan Bhandari for the July 10, 2013, Westside-Kelowna by-election.

See also
List of British Columbia political parties

References

Political parties established in 2013
Vision, BC
Surrey, British Columbia
2013 establishments in British Columbia